Yang Roy-sung (born 21 April 1973) is a South Korean fencer. He competed in the individual and team épée events at the 1996 and 2000 Summer Olympics.

References

External links
 

1973 births
Living people
South Korean male épée fencers
Olympic fencers of South Korea
Fencers at the 1996 Summer Olympics
Fencers at the 2000 Summer Olympics
Asian Games medalists in fencing
Fencers at the 1998 Asian Games
Fencers at the 2002 Asian Games
Asian Games gold medalists for South Korea
Asian Games bronze medalists for South Korea
Medalists at the 1998 Asian Games
Medalists at the 2002 Asian Games